Partition Horrors Remembrance Day is an annual national memorial day observed on 14 August in India, commemorating the victims and sufferings of people during the 1947 partition of India. It was first observed in 2021, after announcement by Prime Minister Narendra Modi.

The day remembers the sufferings of many Indians during the partition. Several families were displaced and many lost their lives in the partition. It aims to remind Indians the need to remove social divisions, disharmony and to further strengthen the spirit of oneness, social harmony and human empowerment.

The partition had left 10 to 20 million people displaced and left 2 hundred thousand to 2 million dead.

Background

The Partition was the division of British India into two independent Dominions: India and Pakistan. The two states have since gone through further reorganization: the Dominion of India is today the Republic of India (since 1950); while the Dominion of Pakistan was composed of what is known today as the Islamic Republic of Pakistan (since 1956) and the People's Republic of Bangladesh (since 1971). The partition involved the division of two provinces, Bengal and Punjab, based on district-wide non-Muslim or Muslim majorities. The partition also saw the division of the British Indian Army, the Royal Indian Navy, the Indian Civil Service, the railways, and the central treasury. The partition was outlined in the Indian Independence Act 1947 and resulted in the dissolution of the British Raj, i.e. Crown rule in India. The two self-governing independent Dominions of India and Pakistan legally came into existence at midnight on 15 August 1947.

The partition displaced between 10 and 20 million people along religious lines, creating overwhelming refugee crises in the newly constituted dominions. There was large-scale violence, with estimates of the loss of life accompanying or preceding the partition disputed and varying between several hundred thousand and two million. The violent nature of the partition created an atmosphere of hostility and suspicion between India and Pakistan that affects their relationship to this day.

Observance of Remembrance Day

On 14 August 2021, Prime Minister Narendra Modi declared that the 14 of August annually will be remembered as Partition Horrors Remembrance Day to remind the nation of the sufferings and sacrifices of Indians during the partition in 1947.

On 14 August 2021, Prime Minister Narendra Modi said, "Partitions pains can never be forgotten. Millions of our sisters and brothers were displaced and many lost their lives due to mindless hate and violence. In memory of the struggles and sacrifices of our people, 14th August will be observed as Partition Horrors Remembrance Day, May the Partition Horrors Remembrance Day keep reminding us of the need to remove the poison of social divisions, disharmony and further strengthen the spirit of oneness, social harmony and human empowerment."

In 2022, the Delhi Metro honoured Partition Horrors Remembrance Day by setting up an exhibit that included "panels on the wrecked buildings in Lahore and Amritsar".

The University Grants Commission, in 2022, implored all academic institutions to plan observances for Partition Horrors Remembrance Day. The University of Kashmir honoured Partition Horrors Remembrance Day by organising a photo exhibition aimed at highlighting "the agony, suffering and pain of millions of sufferers of the Partition".

See also
Opposition to the partition of India
The 1947 Partition Archive

Notes

References

August observances
Public holidays in India